Bitter Harvest is a 2017 period romantic-drama film set in Soviet Ukraine in the early 1930s. The film is the first English language feature film depicting Ukraine's 1932/33 famine known as the Holodomor, a period of massive famines that killed millions of mostly ethnic Ukrainians. The film stars Max Irons, Samantha Barks, Barry Pepper, Tamer Hassan, Lucy Brown and Terence Stamp.

The film was directed by George Mendeluk. It was written by Canadian screenwriter-actor Richard Bachynsky Hoover, based on his own Holodomor research. Filming took place in Kyiv.

Plot 

The Ukrainian Cossack, Ivan Kachanuik, defends his family in the Central Ukraine hamlet village of Smila.

Years later, in 1932, Ivan's artist grandson Yuri marries his childhood sweetheart, Natalka, and studies at the Kyiv Art Academy. His family are independent Cossack farmers, "kurkuli". They make a living from grain, sunflowers and other crops until Joseph Stalin's collectivization campaign sends the Soviet army to requisition 90% of Ukraine's harvest.

The State Art Institute is forced to replace the art instructors with communist instructors who censor art such as Yuri's, condemning its expression of Ukrainian cultural identity as anti-Soviet. Yuri storms out in disgust.

During a memorial in a pub for a friend who committed suicide, a half drunk aggressive Soviet captain insults the Ukrainian folklore, music, songs, and dance, starting a fight during which Yuri stabs the captain in self defense. The dreamy romantic artist from Smila winds up arrested and locked up in a brutal Soviet prison with Kulak farmers and various Ukrainian nationalists and others whom Stalin deems "Enemies of the People. Witnessing daily mass executions outside his caged cell window . Weeks later the sadistic prison commissar director Medvedev demands Yuri paint his own portrait in return for more food and to save his life, but Yuri senses the director will have him executed as soon as the portrait is completed. During their second sitting, Yuri throws him off guard and  stabs the director in the throat with his paintbrush, killing him and takes his Russian uniform coat and escapes the prison during a blizzard while being hunted relentlessly by the Bolshevik soldier guards.

Meanwhile, back in the Cossack farming village Smila, Yuri's wife Natalka and family are enduring the terror of farm director Commissar Sergei Koltsov who attempts to rape her and uses food as a weapon to control her, but Natalka poisons his borscht with wild mushrooms. Sergei eventually comes around searching for Natalka who fled the scene to join the other peasant women. She bravely plans a revolt, which backfires thinking Sergei was dead , they are overpowered on Sergei's  orders to have his Bolshevik attack and put down the peasant Womens revolt. Yuri's family and the villagers are imprisoned in the local church, which now transformed into their own torture chamber and prison cell.

While being hunted by the Bolshevik police and soldiers in the northern Kyivan forests Yuri comes across a hungry desperate boy named Lubko who asks Yuri to help him survive as he offers his help through the forest to a cattle train stop towards Smila . That evening they are joined at their camp by the Holodny Yar (Cold Ravine) Ukrainian Cossack detachment. They plan an attack on the Bolsheviks and wind up in a bloody battle the next morning against the Bolsheviks Gatling gunning down the uprising. Both sides suffer heavy casualties.

Yuri and Lubko survive and continue their journey towards Smila by sneaking aboard a cattle train full of starved Ukrainian corpses. They witness massive starvation and death of their fellow Ukrainians on the roadsides and in pits. Nearing Smila they hijack a loaded Soviet grain truck whose sympathetic Bolshevik soldier driver joins Yuri's rescue mission, bringing grain to the struggling now artist warriors family and their neighbouring villagers.

Yuri, Natalka, and Lubko escape, others of the family starve or are murdered by Koltsov's forces. They are pursued onto another cattle train of Ukrainian corpses on their way to be dumped into fire pits, and, jumping the train, are chased to the Soviet border, the cold and turbulent Zbruch River. They dodge bullets under water crossing to Polish-controlled West Ukraine to get to the city of Lviv, hoping for help from the priest Andrey Sheptytsky to exchange the vast rich pastures of Ukraine for the prairies of Manitoba, Canada.

Cast

Production 
Writer Richard Bachynsky Hoover, of Ukrainian heritage, visited Ukraine between 1999 and 2004  and took part in the Orange Revolution. He drafted the screenplay for several years and unsuccessfully sought financing from the Ukrainian Government and Ukrainian oligarchs, until, in 2011 "never giving up" he was tipped off at a Ukrainian Church bake sale by a kind concerned Ukrainian lady who wrote down a potential well known investor, So on that note the writer followed up and approached the  mysterious Canadian Ukrainian Mr.Ian Ihnatowicz on a cold telephone pitch call" who took deep interest in Richards rough screenplay and agreed to fund his research and development before committing in 2013 to financing the $21 million film in its entirety.

Filming began on location in Ukraine on November 15, 2013, under the working title "The Devil's Harvest". Ihnatowycz said, "Given the importance of the Holodomor, and that few outside Ukraine knew about this man-made famine, because it had been covered up by the Kremlin regime, this chapter of history needed to be told in English on the silver screen for the first time in feature film history."

The shoot ended in Kyiv on February 5, 2014, concurrent with the Euromaidan demonstrations in which Bachynsky Hoover and several local crew took part.

Post-production continued in early 2014 at London's Pinewood Studios, using the James Bond tank to film underwater scenes. Skyfall editor Stuart Baird and SFX teams worked on the film in post-production.

Release 
Roadside Attractions, an Indy arm of Americas Lions Gate Films Corp., released the film in the US on February 24, 2017. "D" Films Canada launched Bitter Harvest on March 3 in Canada. The film was launched in other countries during the first quarter of 2017.

Reception

Box office 
Global box office sales were approximately $1 million. It was screened in various venues in more than 100 countries in 2017/18.

Critical response 
Bitter Harvest received mostly negative reviews. On Rotten Tomatoes, it has a 15% approval rating, based on 61 reviews. The consensus states, "Bitter Harvest lives down to its title with a clichéd wartime romance, whose clumsy melodrama dishonors the victims of the real-life horrors it uses as a backdrop." Sheri Linden of the Los Angeles Times called the film "utterly devoid of emotional impact." Several reviews agreed that the film would raise awareness, but did not accurately depict the subject matter, with Peter Debruge of Variety stating that "there can be no doubt that the events deserve a more compelling and responsible treatment than this."

The New York Times, in review, wrote, "The topic is worthy, but the execution is painfully heavy-handed."

Film critic Godfrey Cheshire rated Bitter Harvest 2 stars out of 5. In review, he wrote, "Unfortunately, 'Bitter Harvest' can't even claim the virtues of a superior dramatic feature. Born in Germany of Ukrainian descent, Mendeluk has spent most his career as a director of Canadian TV movies, which this film unsurprisingly resembles. [...] Its narrative and visual approach almost suggests a compendium of the clichés one should avoid in a film like this."

In positive reviews, Adrian Bryttan of The Ukrainian Weekly praised the film's direction and storytelling, calling it the "world-class Ukrainian art film of our time."

The Sydney Morning Herald called the film "a rousing tale with political pertinence".

See also 
 Famine-33
 The Guide
 Russia-Ukraine relations

References

External links 
 
 
 
 
 

2017 films
2017 romantic drama films
Canadian romantic drama films
Canadian epic films
English-language Canadian films
Films set in Ukraine
Films shot in Romania
Films shot in Ukraine
Films scored by Benjamin Wallfisch
Films about the Holodomor
Romantic epic films
Films about famine
2010s English-language films
Films directed by George Mendeluk
2010s Canadian films